Manuel Angelucci (born 28 January 1988) is a former Italian footballer.

Biography
Angelucci started his career at Ternana. He had played for U17 team in 2004–05 season; both U18 team and the reserve in 2005–06 and the reserve in 2006–07. (Despite Ternana relegated from Serie B in 2006, its reserve still admitted to 2006–07 Campionato Nazionale Primavera) He was loaned to Nocerina for 2007–08 Serie D and Mezzocorona for 2008–09 Lega Pro Seconda Divisione. Angelucci played once in 2009–10 Lega Pro Prima Divisione. On 1 February 2010 he was signed by Monopoli.

Angelucci played twice in 2005 FIFA U-17 World Championship. He also played 4 times in 2005 UEFA European Under-17 Football Championship.

References

External links
 Football.it Profile 
 FIGC 
 

Italian footballers
Ternana Calcio players
A.S.G. Nocerina players
A.C. Mezzocorona players
Association football defenders
1988 births
Living people